Adam James is an Indigenous Australian country singer from Moreton Bay. He is the host of Letterbox, a TV series broadcast on Fox and NITV. James won a Deadly in 2008 for Best New Talent and was a finalist at the 2008 Toyota Star Maker Quest in Tamworth.

Discography
 Messages and Memories (2007)
 "Many Who Pretend"
 "The Country Singer" (2008)
 Children of the Sunrise (2010)

References

External links
Adam James web page

Indigenous Australian musicians
Australian male singers
Living people
Year of birth missing (living people)